Kalvåg is a village in Bremanger Municipality in Vestland county, Norway. It is located on the southeast side of the island of Frøya on the coast along the Frøysjøen strait, the southern entrance to the Nordfjorden. The village of Kalvåg was the administrative centre of the old municipality of Bremanger that existed from 1838 until 1964 when the municipality was enlarged and the administration center was moved east to the mainland village of Svelgen. There is a series of bridges that connect Kalvåg to the nearby island of Bremangerlandet.

Today, the village of Kalvåg has a unique collection of old waterfront buildings, reputed to be the largest and best-kept waterfront environment in the county. Many of the old wharf buildings have been restored and converted to provide accommodation. The harbor is very good, with spacious public quays. Throughout the municipality of Bremanger, there are tourist destinations such as Grotlesanden, the Hornelen cliff, rock carvings at Vingen, and the old trading stations of Rugsund and Smørhavn.

Name
The first part of the name Kalvåg (previously spelled Kalvaag) comes from the verb kala which means "to make cold" or "to freeze". The second element is the genitive case of the Old Norse vágr which means "bay", therefore the name could be explained as a bay which often freezes in winter.

Notable residents
Nikolai Astrup, born in Kalvåg in 1880
Heidi Grande Røys, a member of Stoltenberg's Second Cabinet

External links
 Kalvåg in pictures

References

Villages in Vestland
Bremanger